The 1962–63 NBA season was the Warriors' 17th season in the NBA and 1st in the San Francisco Bay Area. During the start of their regular season, they began with a 7-3 record (including three straight overtime games from October 26–28) before having an eleven-game losing streak from late November to early December that they would never recover from.

Offseason

Roster

Regular season

Season standings

x – clinched playoff spot

Record vs. opponents

Game log

Awards and records
 Wilt Chamberlain, NBA All-Star Game
 Tom Meschery, NBA All-Star Game
 Wilt Chamberlain, NBA Scoring Champion
 Wilt Chamberlain, All-NBA Second Team

References

Golden State Warriors seasons
San Francisco
Golden
Golden